The Joint Chiefs of Staff Committee (JCSC),; is an administrative body of senior high-ranking uniformed military leaders of the unified Pakistan Armed Forces who advises the civilian Government of Pakistan, National Security Council, Defence Minister, President and Prime minister of Pakistan on important military and non-military strategic matters. It is defined by statute, and consists of a Chairman, the military chiefs from Army, Navy and the Air Force: all four-star officers appointed by the President, on the advice of the Prime minister. The chairman is selected based on seniority and merit from the Chiefs of service of the three branches of the Pakistan Armed and Defense Services. Each service chief, outside their Joint Chiefs of Staff obligations, performs their duty directly for the Ministry of Defence.

Following the Hamoodur Rahman Commission, the Joint Chiefs of Staff Committee does not have operational command authority. Instead, the Joint Chief of Staff Committee is a principal military advisory body, and coordinates command operations between the services. The committee is headed by the four-star officer who is designated as the Chairman Joint Chiefs of Staff Committee (CJCSC). The chairman is the de Jure Commander in chief of all services of the Pakistan Armed Forces, but he does not have operational authority over combatant forces, which report directly to their Chiefs of Staff.

The Joint Staff, is headquartered in Rawalpindi near the vicinity of Naval, Air, GHQ headquarters. The Joint Chief of Staff Committee is composed of all uniformed military personnel from each inter-service, who assist the Chairman to coordinate military efforts.

Historical overview

Early years: 1950s–71

In early 1950s, the recommendations were sent to the government of establishing the joint staff committee, but it was resisted by the Navy as it feared that it would be dominated by the army. As the military of Pakistan grew in size and political influence increased after the 1965 war with India. Though, the joint coordination mechanism was felt but no steps were taken.

Martial law was proclaimed all over in Pakistan for the second time on March 25, 1969 to curb civil disobedience which was especially chronic in East Pakistan. The number of army personnel in the Eastern region was increased in the beginning of 1971 fearing a possible Indian intervention.

As the crisis in East Pakistan progressed, following the intervention by India, the top military brass had the full control of the military and state's affairs.  In the absence of the joint staff mechanism, the defence plans and executions of operations were oversaw by each inter-service which affected the overall performance of the armed forces. Coordination between each inter-service became increasingly difficult. In a thesis written by Pervez Cheema, the 1971 war was fought "without a purpose and with total lack of coordination between the civil effort and the armed forces, and between four fighting services: the Army, Navy and Air Force." Furthermore, the federal studies also noted that the top military brass had alienated the Army, Navy and Air Force. in which, none weren't taken in confidence, and the joint efforts were unsupported at either a planning or operational level, and were also constrained over disagreements during the Indo-Pakistani War of 1971. Due to lack of complete and comprehensive communication, each services blamed the others for operational failures.

Higher Direction of War act

As surrendered to India in 1971, Prime minister Zulfikar Ali Bhutto formed a federal commission chaired by Chief Justice Hamoodur Rahman to conduct federal studies on the failure of the civil-military relations. Recommendations noted in "Higher Direction of War act" in the HRC report, it strongly called for the establishment of Joint Chiefs of Staff Committee (JCSC) mechanism with headquartered in MoD. Per the act, the JCSC composed of a chairman, the Chief of Naval Staff, the Chief of Army Staff, and the Chief of Air Staff. It was mandate to have a collective responsibility of national defence and mechanism of plans based on a joint objectives. The chairmanship was to be rotated between each inter-services, irrespective of the personal ranks in each service.

Lesson learns and recommendations after the 1971 war with India, all military work, combat coordination, and joint missions are overseen by the Joint Chiefs of Staff Committee at the Joint Staff Headquarters located in Rawalpindi, Punjab, Pakistan. All studies were accepted in March 1976, the Joint Chiefs of Staff Committee was officially formed with army general Muhammad Shariff becoming its first Chairman Joint Chiefs of Staff Committee. It is headed by a four-star officer designated as Chairman.  , there had been fourteen four-star Pakistan military officers who headed the Committee Secretariat. Altogether, there has been twelve were from the army, one from the Air Force, and two from the Navy have served.

The headquarters are known as Joint Staff Headquarters and act as secretariat of JCSC. It is located at Chaklala, Rawalpindi. , General SAHIR SHAMSHAD MIRZA is serving as Chairman Joint chiefs. The federal studies were fully supported by the military and many of the recommendations were implemented in 1980s to improve the joint efforts.

Roles and responsibilities

Military failure in Bangladesh and war with India in 1971, the federal studies on civil military relations led by the Commission by Chief Justice Hamoodur Rahman helped establishing the Joint Chiefs of Staff Committee to coordinate the joint missions and executions of their work altogether during operations.

The Chairmanship of Joint Chiefs rotates among the three Inter-Services; the Chairman joint chiefs is appointed by the Prime minister and confirmed by the President. The Chairman of the Joint Chiefs of Staff Committee outranks all other four-star officers; however, he does not have operational command authority over the Armed Forces. In his capacity as chief military adviser, he assists the Prime Minister and the Minister of Defense in exercising their command functions.

Technically, the Joint Chiefs of Staff Committee is the highest military body; and its Chairman joint chiefs serves as the Principal Staff Officer (PSO) to the civilian Prime Minister, Cabinet, National Security Council (its adviser), and the President. The Joint Chiefs of Staff Committee deals with joint military planning, joint training, integrated joint logistics, and provides strategic directions of the armed forces. Reviews periodically the role, size, and shape of three Inter–Services, the Joint Chiefs of Staff Committee advise the civilian government on strategic communications, industrial mobilizations plans, and formulating the defence plans.  In many ways, the JCSC provides an important link to understand, maintain balance, and resolve conflicts in the civil military relations between military and political circles.  In times of peace, the Joint Chiefs of Staff Committee's principal functions are to conduct planning of civil–military input; in times of war, the Chairman acts as principal military adviser to the Prime Minister in the supervision and conduct of joint warfare.

Current leadership

Permanent members

Temporary members

See also
 Joint Chiefs of Staff—United States
 Chiefs of Staff Committee—United Kingdom
 General Staff of the Armed Forces of the Russian Federation
 Joint Chiefs of Staff—South Korea
 Joint warfare

References

Further reading
 Aziz, Mazhar (2007). Military Control in Pakistan: The Parallel State. Routledge Publishing Co. .
 
 Butler, Rhett. "Pakistan: National Security". Mongabay.com.
 Chand, Attar (1989). Defence Modernization, Secret Deals, and Strategy of Nations: A Global Study of Army, Navy, Air Force, and Para-military Forces (1st ed.). New Delhi, India: Mittal Publications. .
 Cheema, Pervaiz Iqbal (2002). The Armed Forces of Pakistan. New York: New York University Press. .
 
 
 Pakistan, as released by the Government of (2007). "§XII: Higher Direction of War". Hamoodur Rahman Commission: supplementary report. Rockville, Md: Arc Manor. pp. 105–108. . Retrieved 5 December 2014.
 Shafqat, Saeed (1997). Civil-military relations in Pakistan: From Zulfikar Ali Bhutto to Benazir Bhutto. Boulder, Colo.: Westview Press. .
 Shah, Aqil (2014). The Army and Democracy: Military Politics in Pakistan. [U.S.]: Harvard University Press. .

 
Military of Pakistan
Pakistani military leaders